Robert Bradford may refer to:
Robert F. Bradford (1902–1983), Governor of Massachusetts, 1947–1949
Robert William Bradford (born 1923), Canadian aviation artist
Bobby Bradford (born 1934), American jazz trumpeter
Robert Bradford (Northern Irish politician) (1941–1981), Ulster Unionist Member of Parliament, assassinated in 1981
Robert Bradford (cricketer) (born 1952), English cricketer